Hewenden Reservoir is a fresh-water reservoir near to Cullingworth in West Yorkshire, England. The Bradford Corporation built the reservoir, which was flooded in 1845, and is now part of the Yorkshire Water portfolio.

History
Hewenden Reservoir was built as a result of the Bradford Waterworks Act of 1842. The act allowed the Bradford Corporation to abstract large volumes of water from Many Wells Spring, which supplied Hewenden Beck (Harden Beck). This concerned mill owners further downstream on Harden Beck. As a condition of the act, the reservoir at Hewenden was constructed as a compensation Reservoir, which would guarantee a steady flow of water in Harden Beck.

During construction, "three large vertical cracks" appeared in one of the culverts that had just been built, and so remedial action was necessary to the dam walls. By January 1845, the remediation works were completed and the dam wall was complete. Minor works were finalised in the same year and flooding commenced in late spring, though by June, when the reservoir was about 66% full, the dam wall was observed as having collapsed in places. The final cost of the reservoir was £4,856.

The reservoir now feeds water into Harden Beck, with Hewenden itself being fed by Milking Hole Beck and Denholme Beck, the latter of which flows out from Doe Park Reservoir in Denholme, which has been culverted. Hewenden Reservoir is now owned and operated by Yorkshire Water.

The reservoir is noted for being one of the top ten recorded wettest places in Britain; in June 1956,  of rain fell in 120 minutes, at that time, the largest amount of rainfall ever recorded in Yorkshire. After a long period where the veracity of this claim was doubted in some meteorological circles, a review of the data and weather systems on the day, determined that  fell in 105 minutes.

Notes

References

Sources

External links

Plan of reservoir and adjacent Hewenden Viaduct

Reservoirs in West Yorkshire
Geography of the City of Bradford
Reservoirs in England